Kindli is a traditional hotel and restaurant founded in 1474 and located in the historic city center Lindenhof of Zürich, Switzerland.

All hotel rooms are furnished individually in the English country house style and contains the Hästens beds of high quality.
Locations:
Hotel: Pfalzgasse 1, 8001 Zürich
Business apartments: Rollengasse 2, 8001 Zürich
Restaurant: Beim Rennweg, 8001 Zürich

See also 
List of oldest companies

References

External links 
Homepage in German
Location on Google Maps

Hotels in Zürich
Restaurants in Switzerland
Companies established in the 15th century
15th-century establishments in Switzerland